The 1979 British motorcycle Grand Prix was the eleventh round of the 1979 Grand Prix motorcycle racing season. It took place on the weekend of 10–12 August 1979 at the Silverstone Circuit.

Race summary
The 500cc British Grand Prix would be one of the closest races in Grand Prix history. The race began with Barry Sheene, Kenny Roberts and Wil Hartog breaking away from the rest of the field. At the midpoint of the race, Hartog fell off the pace as Sheene and Roberts continued to battle for the lead. They continued to swap the lead throughout the 28 lap event with Roberts winning ahead of Sheene by a narrow margin of just three-hundreds of a second.

Minutes before the start of the race, Roberts' Yamaha blew a seal and sprayed the bike with oil. His crew managed to replace the seal in time but, Roberts went to the starting line with his gloves coated with oil, causing his hand to slip on the throttle during the race.

After an eleven-year absence from world championship racing, Honda returned to competition with the exotic, four-stroke NR500 ridden by riders Mick Grant and Takazumi Katayama. The motorcycle featured an engine with oval-shaped cylinders as well as a monocoque chassis. Both bikes retired from the race, Grant crashing out on the first turn after the bike spilled oil onto his rear tire. Katayama retired on the seventh lap due to ignition problems.

Classification

500 cc

350cc

250cc

125cc

B2A Sidecars Standings

B2B Sidecars Standings

References

External links
 A Thriller At Silverstone - Sports Illustrated, August 20, 1979
  Part 1
  Part 2
  Part 3
  Part 4

British motorcycle Grand Prix
British
Motorcycle Grand Prix
British Motorcycle Grand Prix